Plouguenast (Gallo: Ploegenas) is a former commune in the Côtes-d'Armor department of Brittany in northwestern France. On 1 January 2019, it was merged into the new commune Plouguenast-Langast.

Climate 
Plouguenast has a oceanic climate (Köppen climate classification Cfb).

Population

Inhabitants of Plouguenast are called plouguenastais in French.

See also
Communes of the Côtes-d'Armor department

References

External links

Official website 

Former communes of Côtes-d'Armor